Wicklow Gaol is a former prison, now a museum, located in the town of Wicklow, County Wicklow, Ireland.

History

Prison
There has been a prison on the site since the late eighteenth century. Prisoners were held at Wicklow Gaol during the 1798 Rebellion and the Great Famine, as well as many held there prior to penal transportation.

The prison was extended in 1822 to a design by William Vitruvius Morrison, and further extended 1842-3.

The prison was closed down by 1900 but reopened to hold republican prisoners during the Irish War of Independence and Irish Civil War; the last prisoners left in 1924.

Museum
In 1995 renovations began, and it reopened as a museum in 1998, claiming to be one of the world's most haunted buildings, due to the long history of suffering associated with it. The prison was featured on a 2009 episode of Ghost Hunters International.

References

External links
Official site

Gaol
Prison museums in the Republic of Ireland
Defunct prisons in the Republic of Ireland
Reportedly haunted locations in Ireland